Hitchcock is a city in Galveston County, Texas, United States. The population was 6,961 at the 2010 census.

History

Hitchcock was created as a station of the railroad between Galveston and Houston in 1873 and around the turn of the 20th century, became a vegetable shipping center. The settlement's economy crashed in the 1930s after insect plagues in the surrounding areas, and the area stayed impoverished until the establishment of the Camp Wallace anti-aircraft training base and the Naval Air Station Hitchcock at the beginning of World War II. After the end of the war, the bases were used as discharge centers, and some former soldiers settled in the area. Hitchcock was established in 1960 as the area's population boomed, topping out at nearly 7,000 by the end of the 1960s. Today, the town serves as a suburb of Galveston and houses workers from the Johnson Space Center.

Since 1984, Hitchcock has been home to the Galveston County Fair & Rodeo.  The Galveston County Fair & Rodeo began in 1938 and was held at facilities in Runge Park in Arcadia. In the early 1980s, the County Fair had reached its limits of growth at Runge Park, and plans began for a move to Jack Brooks Park in Hitchcock. The move to Jack Brooks Park was completed in time for the 1984 fair.

Hitchcock was affected by Hurricane Harvey in 2017. The director of community development, D. Joe Wood, stated that bankruptcy was a possibility in the post-Hurricane environment.

Geography

Hitchcock is located at  (29.338715, –95.010861).

Demographics

2020 census

As of the 2020 United States census, there were 7,301 people, 2,880 households, and 2,021 families residing in the city.

2000 census
As of the census of 2000, there were 6,386 people, 2,434 households, and 1,737 families residing in the city. The population density was 96.1 people per square mile (37.1/km2). There were 2,754 housing units at an average density of 41.4 per square mile (16.0/km2). The racial makeup of the city was 59.96% White, 32.81% African American, 0.28% Native American, 0.16% Asian, 0.03% Pacific Islander, 4.76% from other races, and 2.00% from two or more races. Hispanic or Latino of any race were 13.73% of the population.

There were 2,434 households, out of which 32.1% had children under the age of 18 living with them, 48.7% were married couples living together, 17.3% had a female householder with no husband present, and 28.6% were non-families. 25.6% of all households were made up of individuals, and 10.8% had someone living alone who was 65 years of age or older. The average household size was 2.62 and the average family size was 3.14.

In the city, the population was spread out, with 27.7% under the age of 18, 8.4% from 18 to 24, 27.2% from 25 to 44, 22.2% from 45 to 64, and 14.4% who were 65 years of age or older. The median age was 36 years. For every 100 females, there were 92.2 males. For every 100 females age 18 and over, there were 87.3 males.

The median income for a household in the city was $29,848, and the median income for a family was $35,013. Males had a median income of $31,098 versus $22,340 for females. The per capita income for the city was $14,964. About 16.3% of families and 19.0% of the population were below the poverty line, including 27.3% of those under age 18 and 15.8% of those age 65 or over.

Government and infrastructure

The Hitchcock Post Office is located at 8120 Texas State Highway 6.

Education

Primary and secondary schools

Public schools
Most of the city of Hitchcock is served by the Hitchcock Independent School District.

Some of Hitchcock is served by the Santa Fe Independent School District.

Private schools
Our Lady of Lourdes School, a Roman Catholic elementary school operated by the Roman Catholic Archdiocese of Galveston-Houston, is in Hitchcock.

Colleges and universities
The Hitchcock and Santa Fe districts (and therefore all of Hitchcock) are served by the College of the Mainland.

Public libraries
The Genevieve Miller Hitchcock Public Library was established in 2015.

Parks and recreation
Each year Juneteenth is celebrated in the Stringfellow Orchards, a complex previously owned by a slave owner. The Texas Historical Commission enacted a historical marker in 1992. In 2004, the site had not been previously maintained, but John Collins discovered the site in 2004 and, with his wife Doris, later purchased it.  the Collinses remain the owners.

Notable people

 Taurian Fontenette (born 1983), famous streetball player whose nicknames include "The Air Up There" and "Mr. 720"
 Randy Hymes, former NFL player who played for Baltimore Ravens, Jacksonville Jaguars, and Minnesota Vikings
 David M. Medina,  former Texas Supreme Court and General Counsel to Governor Rick Perry
 Michael Sam, Free Agent defensive end, first openly gay NFL player

References

External links
 City of Hitchcock official website
 Historic Images from the Genevieve Miller Public Library, hosted by the Portal to Texas History
 

Cities in Texas
Cities in Galveston County, Texas
Greater Houston
Galveston Bay Area
Populated places established in 1873
1873 establishments in Texas
Populated coastal places in Texas